Bhikhari Thakur (1887–1971) was an Indian Bhojpuri-Language poet and playwright. He wrote more than a dozen plays and also poems and some other works.

List of works

References

 Bhojpuri language
Works by Indian writers